The 1896 St. Louis–East St. Louis tornado (great cyclone) was a historic tornado that caused severe damage to downtown St. Louis, Missouri, East St. Louis, Illinois, and surrounding areas on Wednesday, May 27, 1896 about 5:00 pm. One of the deadliest and most destructive tornadoes in U.S. history, this tornado was the most notable of a major tornado outbreak across the central United States which produced several other large, long-track, violent tornadoes and continued across the eastern United States the following day. The St. Louis tornado killed at least 255 people, injured over a thousand others, and caused more than $10 million in damage (equivalent to $ million in ) in about 20 minutes. More than 5,000 people were left homeless and lost all of their possessions. The hardest-hit areas of the city were the fashionable Lafayette Square and Compton Heights neighborhoods, as well as the poorer Mill Creek Valley. It remains the third-deadliest tornado in United States history.

May 1896 tornado outbreak

While a storm had been predicted for the latter days in May, many disregarded the warning or felt that the city of St. Louis would not be affected. Weather forecasters at the time lacked technology sufficient to predict tornadoes (then commonly called "cyclones") of this magnitude, but they were able to predict strong storm systems in general. The day started quietly, with people going about their daily business; the weather in the morning did not indicate any severe weather event. The local weather bureau predicted thunderstorms but nothing more serious. Around noon, the clouds began to appear more ominous and the barometric pressure dropped, alarming those who knew this was an indication of a tornado.

Into the afternoon, the skies continued to darken, but the Weather Bureau Observatory was not overly concerned. Many residents, however, fled to their homes, anticipating severe weather. At 4:30 PM local time, the temperature dropped rapidly and black and greenish clouds approached the city; near 5:00 PM, the sky reportedly became as dark as midnight. As the thunderstorm approached St. Louis, the western portion of the city was particularly affected.

The first significant tornado of the day formed near Bellflower, Missouri, and killed one person, a woman. Three students died and 16 were injured when the Dye School in Audrain County was struck around 6:15 PM. The same tornado killed one student and injured 19 others at the Bean Creek school a few minutes later. At 6:30 PM, two supercell thunderstorms produced two additional tornadoes. One decimated farms in New Minden, Hoyleton, Richview, and Irvington, Illinois. Twenty-seven more people died in the other Illinois tornadoes of this outbreak.

St. Louis–East St. Louis tornado

The tornado spawned from the other supercell touched down in St. Louis, Missouri, then one of the largest and most influential cities in the country. It was one of at least 18 tornadoes to occur on that day, and it quickly became the third-deadliest as well as the then-costliest tornado in United States history. At least 137 people died as the tornado traversed the core of the downtown area, leaving a continuous,  swath of destroyed homes, schools, saloons, factories, mills, churches, parks, and railroad yards in its wake. A few of the destroyed homes were all but completely swept away.

The tornado then crossed the Mississippi River and struck the Eads Bridge, where a  wooden plank was found driven through a  wrought iron plate. Uncounted others may have died on boats on the river, which could have swept their bodies downriver where they could not be recorded in the official death toll. The tornado continued into East St. Louis, Illinois, where it was smaller, but more intense. Homes and buildings along the river were completely swept away and a quarter of the buildings there were damaged or destroyed. An additional 118 people were killed, 35 of whom were at the Vandalia railroad freight yards. By the end of the day, the confirmed death toll stood at 255, with some estimates above 400; more than 1,000 were injured. The tornado was later rated F4 on the Fujita scale.

Following the cyclone's destruction, members of Light Battery "A" and the First Regiment were placed on volunteer duty. Within an hour of the tornado striking, 32 members were on duty with ambulances and hospital corps to assist in rescue operations and to help victims. The mayor asked that both commands remain on patrol duty on May 30. Members of the bicycle corps of Company "G" First Regiment assisted when railway service was inaccessible. Telephone and telegraph wires were destroyed and streets were impassable. Officers were summoned to duty by bicycle couriers, as this was the only means of communication. Enough damage was done to the city that there was some speculation that St. Louis might not be able to host the 1896 Republican National Convention in June, just three weeks later, but after a massive clean-up effort, the convention went ahead as planned.

Long-term impact
The May 27, 1896, St. Louis tornado was the most devastating known in the United States up to that time. Approximately 12,000 buildings were seriously damaged, valued in excess of $10 million. In the wake of highly sensationalized local, national, and international news coverage of the St. Louis tornado, over 140,000 sightseers flocked to inspect the damaged areas. The cyclone permanently altered the course of residential, commercial, and industrial development in the most heavily damaged areas of the city.

Political reverberations came in the 1897 city elections, when middle-class reform candidates were decisively defeated by a coalition supported largely by the German vote in heavily impacted neighborhoods.

In perspective

St. Louis tornado history

It is somewhat rare for the core of a large city to be hit directly by a tornado (due to their relatively small area and the relative lack of large cities in the highest tornado threat region)—especially a large and intense tornado—yet several other tornadoes have tracked through the City of St. Louis during its history. Several of these tornadoes were also very deadly and destructive. Tornadoes have hit St. Louis in 1871 (9 killed); 1890 (4 killed); 1904 (3 killed, 100 injured); 1927 (72-79+ killed, 550+ injured); and 1959 (21 killed, 345 injured). This makes St. Louis the most tornado-afflicted urban area in the U.S. Additionally, the Greater St. Louis area is the scene of even more historically destructive and deadly tornadoes. Oklahoma City is the metropolitan area with the most frequent significant tornadoes.

1896 tornado season

In what was apparently an intense tornado outbreak sequence, other major tornado outbreaks occurred on May 15, May 17, and May 24–25, with other smaller outbreaks during the month as well. The middle to end of May was extremely active but sparse records preclude knowing much detail. Tom Grazulis has stated that the week of May 24–28 was "perhaps the most violent single week of tornado activity in US history".

The 1896 tornado season has the distinction of being one of the deadliest in United States history. There were at least 40 killer tornadoes between April 11 and November 26, including this one, which was the only one to kill more than 100 people in two separate cities.

See also
 List of North American tornadoes and tornado outbreaks
 List of tornadoes striking downtown areas of large cities
 List of tornado-related deaths at schools

References

Further reading
 Ciampoli, Judith. "The St. Louis Tornado of 1896: Mad Pranks of the Storm King." Gateway Heritage: The Magazine of the Missouri Historical Society (1982) 2#4 pp 24–31.
 Curzon, Julian. The great cyclone at St. Louis and East St. Louis, May 27, 1896. Being a full history of the most terrifying and destructive tornado in the history of the world, with numerous thrilling and pathetic incidents and personal experiences of those who were in the track of the storm. Also an account of the wonderful manifestations of sympathy for the afflicted in all parts of the world (1897) online free also Reprinted 1997 Southern Illinois University Press, .
 Dains, Mary K. "The St. Louis Tornado of 1896." Missouri Historical Review (1972) 66#3 pp 431–445. 
 
 Rogers, Joseph. "Retreat from Reform: St. Louis Politics in the Wake of the 1896 Tornado" Missouri Historical Review (2011) v 106#1 pp 32–47.

External links

Tornado of 1896 Digital Collection, St. Louis Public Library
St. Louis/East St. Louis Tornado of 1896 (Tornado Project)
 St. Louis, Missouri Tornado (National Weather Service St. Louis)
 Great Cyclone at St. Louis, May 27, 1896 (NOAA) Photos
 The Great Cyclone at St. Louis and East St. Louis, May 27, 1896 (St. Louis Public Library)
 Look Back: Massive tornado, landmark buildings help shape fast-growing 1890s and On this date: Great Cyclone of 1896 killed 255 and Great Cyclone of 1896 (St. Louis Post-Dispatch)
 The 1896 Tornado! (Illinois Genealogy Trails History and Genealogy)
 The St. Louis Cyclone of 1896 (US Genealogy Network)
 St. Louis, Missouri Tornado May 1896  at GenDisasters.com
 
Tornado of 1896 Photograph Collection finding aid at the St. Louis Public Library
St. Louis Public Service Company: 1896 Tornado Recollections finding aid at the St. Louis Public Library
Tornado of 1896 Publications finding aid at the St. Louis Public Library

F4 tornadoes by date
St. Louis – East St. Louis,1896-05-27
Tornadoes of 1896
Tornadoes in Missouri
Tornadoes in Illinois
19th century in St. Louis
History of St. Clair County, Illinois
St Louis – East St Louis Tornado, 1896
St. Louis – East St. Louis tornado